WXYZ may refer to:

 The last four letters of the English alphabet
In broadcasting, the following stations
 WXYZ-TV, an ABC-affiliated television station (channel 25, virtual 7) licensed to serve Detroit, Michigan, United States
 WXYT (AM), a radio station (1270 AM) licensed to serve Detroit, which held the call sign WXYZ from 1930 to 1984
 WRIF, a radio station (101.1 FM) licensed to serve Detroit, which held the call sign WXYZ-FM from 1948 to 1971

Other
 WXYZ-UAV, a Chinese unmanned aerial vehicle developed by Wuxi No. 1 Senior High School